Mari Cordes is an American politician who has served in the Vermont House of Representatives since 2019.

References

Living people
University of Michigan alumni
Vermont College of Fine Arts alumni
21st-century American politicians
21st-century American women politicians
Members of the Vermont House of Representatives
Women state legislators in Vermont
Vermont Progressive Party politicians
Year of birth missing (living people)
Place of birth missing (living people)